Cesare Galeotti (5 June 1872, Pietrasanta - 19 February 1929, Paris) was an Italian composer, conductor, and concert pianist. He is best known for his opera Anton which he conducted at its highly lauded premiere at La Scala on 17 February 1900. His other opera Dorisse premiered at La Monnaie in Brussels on 18 April 1910 under the baton of Sylvain Dupuis and with mezzo-soprano Claire Croiza performing as Alays. In addition to writing operas, he also composed a considerable amount of symphonic music.

References

1872 births
1929 deaths
Italian classical composers
Italian male classical composers
Italian conductors (music)
Italian male conductors (music)
Italian classical pianists
Male classical pianists
Italian male pianists
Italian opera composers
Male opera composers
19th-century Italian musicians
19th-century classical pianists
19th-century Italian male musicians